Haitham Mostafa Karar (born 30 Aug 1978) is a Sudanese former footballer who played as midfielder. He was the captain of Al-Hilal Omdurman and the Sudan national team.

Club career 
He joined Al-Hilal in November 1995 after transferring from Al-Ameer Al-Bahrawi, a second league team. He is one of the promising players of Africa. He was on the verge to going to Everton in the transfer window in 2011, but it was declined.

International career 
He led the Sudanese national team to qualify for the 2008 African Cup of Nations, which was the first time for the national team to qualify in over 30 years. He won caps between 2000 and 2012.

Honours

Clubs
Al-Hilal Club

 Sudan Premier League: 1996, 1998, 1999, 2003, 2004, 2005, 2006, 2007, 2009, 2010, 2012

Sudan Cup: 1998, 2000, 2002, 2004, 2009, 2011
Al-Merrikh SC

 Sudan Premier League: 2013
 Sudan Cup: 2013, 2014
 CECAFA Clubs Cup: 2014

Sudan
CECAFA Cup: 2006

Career statistics

International goals

Trivia 
Mustafa is one of Sudan's footballing legends. He is a highly rated player. In his youth years Haitham Mustafa was regarded as a highly talented holding midfielder.

He is a Goodwill Ambassador of the United Nations.

References

External links
 
 

1972 births
Living people
People from Khartoum North
Sudanese footballers
Sudan international footballers
2008 Africa Cup of Nations players
2012 Africa Cup of Nations players
Association football midfielders
2011 African Nations Championship players
Al-Hilal Club (Omdurman) players
Al-Merrikh SC players
Sudan A' international footballers
Sudan Premier League players